WKUL (92.1 FM, "Country K-92") is a radio station licensed to serve Cullman, Alabama.  The station is owned by Jonathan Christian Corp.

Programming
WKUL airs a full-service country music format plus some talk radio programming, most notably Rush Limbaugh.  Programming includes Crook and Chase Country Countdown, Tracy Lawrence "Honky Tonkin", The Trading Post, Taste of Country Nights, Big D and Bubba in The Morning, Tiger Talk, New Music Nashville, Nashville Music Minuet, Tight Lines with Sammy Lee, Gaither Homecoming Radio and Around The Campfire with Ed and Terry (Nominated for 2016 Radio Program of the Year by the WMA). News programming Includes Fox News, ARN News and local news.  Sports programming includes Auburn University Sports and Atlanta Braves Baseball.  The station also airs local high school football games each autumn. High school and Wallace State Community College basketball is broadcast in the winter months. Throughout the year, WKUL-FM broadcasts at a wide variety of live remotes as well. Since the 1980s, WKUL has become famous for its live coverage of severe weather.

History

Originally known as WKLN, this station signed on in September 1967 at 92.1 MHz with 3,000 watts of effective radiated power under the ownership of Kenneth E. Lawrence. In the late 1970s, WKLN was sold to the Jonathan Christian Corporation, run by Jeffrey Liebensberger and Robert Haa. The station shifted to callsign WKLN-FM on January 21, 1982.

In April 1980, Robert Conrad Haa agreed to sell control of station licensee Jonathan Christian Corporation to Donald Houston Mosley.  The deal was approved by the Federal Communications Commission on July 7, 1980.

The station was assigned the current WKUL call letters by the FCC on February 1, 1988. The WKUL callsign originally entered the Cullman market when 1340 AM (now WFMH) went on the air on October 1, 1946.

In November 2006, Don Mosley made a deal to sell his controlling interest in Jonathan Christian Corporation, the licensee for this station, to Ron Mosley.  The deal was approved by the FCC on December 28, 2006, and the transaction was consummated on March 1, 2007. At the conclusion of this deal, Ron Mosley owned 100% of the shares in Jonathan Christian Corp.

In the spring of 2017, the station added an HD signal and launched a gospel music format via translator W250BM (now W252EK) in Cullman, as "Praise 97.9".  (Taken from Alabama Broadcast Media Page)

On air personalities 
Ron Mosley Jr., Ron Mosley Sr., Tim Dobson, Big D & Bubba, Evan Paul, Johnny "Flash" Thornton, Rich Jesse(Sports), Pete Kirby(Sports), Ken Burcham (Sports)

Past Personalities: Grant Smith (deceased), George Spear, Gus Slaten, Dave Cooper, (who later moved to Hollywood and became an actor, appearing in numerous movies and Network T.V. Shows, including over two years on "The West Wing," a hit N.B.C. Series, on which He played a "White House Aide," under His Screen Name "David Cubero"...) Matthew Miller, Andy Mosley, Mark Albritton, Jill Harelson, Steffany Means, Eddie Mack, ("The Mouth of The South") Art Ray.

References

External links
WKUL official website

KUL
Country radio stations in the United States
Talk radio stations in the United States
Radio stations established in 1967
Cullman County, Alabama